Angeline may refer to:

Books
 Angeline, a novella by Émile Zola published in 1898
 Angeline Fowl, fictional character from the Artemis Fowl series
 Someday Angeline, a children's novel by Louis Sachar

Music

Songs
 "Angeline" (Groove Coverage song), 2011
 "Angeline" (Sean Hogan song), 2000
 "Angeline", by Elton John from the album Leather Jackets, 1986
 "Angeline", by Jamiroquai, from the album Rock Dust Light Star, 2010
 "Angeline", by John Martyn, 1986
 "Angeline", by Jonathan Fagerlund, from the album Flying, 2008
 "Angeline", by New World, 1970

Albums
 Angeline Quinto (album), by Filipino singer Angeline Quinto

People
 Princess Angeline ( 1820–1896), born Kikisoblu, daughter of Chief Seattle
 Angeline Armstrong, Australian singer, songwriter, guitarist, and the frontwoman of Telenova
 Angeline Ball (born 1969), Irish actress
 Angeline Barrette, (1896–2007), Canadian supercentenarian
 Angelines Fernández (1922–1994), Spanish-born actress of Mexican film and television
 Angeline Greensill (born 1948), Māori political rights campaigner, academic and leader
 Angeline Kalinowski, (died 1958) victim of Our Lady of the Angels School fire in Chicago
 Angeline Malik, Pakistani director and actress
 Angeline Narayan, Australian Idol contestant
 Angeline Quinto (born 1989), Filipino singer
 Angeline Stickney (1830–1892), American suffragist, abolitionist, and mathematician
 Mary Angeline Teresa McCrory, née Bridget Teresa McCrory (1893–1984), Roman Catholic nun and advocate for the impoverished elderly

Other uses
 Angeline Falls, a waterfall in King County, Washington, US

See also

 Angelyne (disambiguation)
 Angelina (disambiguation)
 Angelini (surname)
 
 
 Angela (disambiguation)
 Angel (disambiguation)